Don Valley East is a provincial electoral district in Toronto, Ontario, Canada. It elects one member to the Legislative Assembly of Ontario.

It was created in 1999 from parts of Don Mills, York Mills, Oriole and Willowdale.

When the riding was created, it included all of North York within the following line: A hydroelectric transmission corridor located south of McNicoll Avenue to Highway 404 to Finch Avenue to the Don River East Branch to Highway 401 to Leslie Street to the CN Railway to Don Mills Road to the CP Railway to the Don River East Branch to the border of East York around Sunrise Avenue.

In 2007, the boundaries were altered slightly. In the northwest, the boundary was changed from the Don River to Leslie Street, and in the south they changed from the North York/East York border to Sunrise Avenue.

This riding underwent significant changes during the 2012 electoral redistribution. It lost almost half of its territory to Don Valley North and gained a significant portion of Don Valley West.

Members of Provincial Parliament

Election results

2007 electoral reform referendum

References

External links
Elections Ontario Past Election Results
Map of riding for 2018 election

Ontario provincial electoral districts
Provincial electoral districts of Toronto